John Coghlan (4 June 1867 – 29 June 1945) was a South African cricketer. He played for Kimberley in the 1889–90 Currie Cup.

References

External links
 

1867 births
1945 deaths
South African cricketers
Griqualand West cricketers